Chocorua may refer to a place name in the White Mountains of New Hampshire, United States:

Mount Chocorua, a distinctive rocky summit
Chocorua, New Hampshire, a village in the town of Tamworth near the mountain
Chocorua Lake, at the base of the mountain
The Chocorua River, the outlet of Chocorua Lake

Other uses
 a genus of spiders; synonym of Diplocephalus